The men's super heavyweight (+91 kg/200.2 lbs) Full-Contact category at the W.A.K.O. European Championships 2004 in Budva was the heaviest of the male Full-Contact tournaments and involved just six participants.  Each of the matches was three rounds of two minutes each and were fought under Full-Contact kickboxing rules.

As there were too few participants for a tournament for eight, two of the fighter had a bye through to the semi finals.  Duško Basrak from Serbia and Montenegro was the gold medallist defeating Poland's Michal Wszelak (who had won a silver in Light-Contact at the last W.A.K.O. world championships) in the final by unanimous decision.  Defeated semi finalists Mikhail Shvoev from Russia and Jukka Saarinen from Finland won bronze.

Results

Key

See also
List of WAKO Amateur European Championships
List of WAKO Amateur World Championships
List of male kickboxers

References

External links
 WAKO World Association of Kickboxing Organizations Official Site

W.A.K.O. European Championships 2004 (Budva)